Free Money (also known as Double Nickels) is a 1998 Canadian black comedy film directed by Yves Simoneau, produced by Nicolas Clermont and written by Anthony Peck and Joseph Brutsman, and starring Marlon Brando in his penultimate film (his final screen appearance was in 2001's The Score).

Plot
Sven "The Swede" Sorenson (Marlon Brando) is a malicious warden of the county, illegally executing some of his worst prisoners. Everybody in town hates and is scared of him, except his twin daughters (Holly Watson and Christin Watson). Swede's twins tell their father they're pregnant, lying in order to manipulate him into forcing their dim boyfriends, Bud Dyerson (Charlie Sheen) and Larry (Thomas Haden Church), into shotgun marriages. He also turns his sons-in-law into slave laborers, so Bud hatches an escape plan to rob a train carrying old bills to the mint for burning. Larry is his reluctant accomplice. When Bud is captured, he is railroaded into Swede's small-town jail by the Judge (Donald Sutherland) and Swede. His death looks certain, until he hatches yet another plan that requires Larry's help. Meanwhile, Judge's daughter and FBI Agent Karen Polarski (Mira Sorvino), come to his aid.

Cast
Marlon Brando - Warden Sven 'The Swede' Sorenson
Holly L Watson - Liv
Christin Watson - Inga
Charlie Sheen - Bud Dyerson
Donald Sutherland - Judge Rolf Rausenberger
Mira Sorvino - Karen Polarski
Thomas Haden Church - Larry
Martin Sheen - New Warden
David Arquette - Ned Jebee

Production
In spite of the high-profile cast, the movie was produced independently from Hollywood, by the Canadian studio Filmline. It was filmed in the country from August 1997 to October 1997, in the Eastern Townships of Quebec. Locales used in the movie include Sutton Junction, Vale Perkins, Highwater, Mansonville, and Mount Owl's Head.

Casting
John Cusack, Alec Baldwin, Nicolas Cage, Alicia Silverstone and Japanese singer Seiko Matsuda were all originally attached to the project.

In a 2008 interview, actor Thomas Haden Church reflected, "At the exact same time I was offered the lead in Free Money with Charlie Sheen and Marlon Brando, I was offered a role in Saving Private Ryan. And I chose to march off to Canada to work with Marlon Brando. I had a manager at the time—we were soon parted—but he was like, "You're gonna go do a movie with Marlon Brando that more than likely no one will see, vs. a really nice role in a movie that's probably going to win Best Picture next year?" And he was right! But the experience working with Marlon in his penultimate performance was irreplaceable. And I spent 10, 12 weeks with him in Quebec, and it was a remarkable experience, and I wouldn't trade it for any credit on my résumé."

The film was able to receive certification as a Quebec production since one of the leading cast members, Donald Sutherland, was a resident of the province. In addition to this, several supporting roles went to local actors. Producer Nicolas Clermont noted that the accents of the local actors could be integrated into the story, since it was set in a small, unidentified border town.

References

External links

1998 films
1990s crime comedy films
Canadian crime comedy films
English-language Canadian films
Films directed by Yves Simoneau
Films scored by Mark Isham
1998 comedy films
Canadian black comedy films
1990s English-language films
1990s Canadian films